The group Styl-Plus (originally STYL) is a Nigerian R&B and pop musical group / quartet.
The founding members were Shifi Emoefe, Tunde Akinsanmi, Yemi Akinwonmi, and Lanre Faneyi, the name STYL being an abbreviation of the founders' first names.

In 1998 Lanre Faneyi died, and Zeal Onyecheme joined the group. This led to the group being renamed Styl-Plus, the "Plus" denoting the new addition to the group.

In 2002 Yemi Akinwonmi left the group unofficially and the musical band became a trio without adding a new member. Starting 2003, the group officially had its own record label, STYL-PLUS. On Thursday November 15, 2018, it was reported that Tunde Akinsanmi left the group in 2012 and adopted a new stage name "Tunde Tdot", leaving Shifi and Zeal who currently act as the flag bearers of the group.

History
STYL was formed in 1997 in Akure, Nigeria and made up of four members. In 2001, the group sang mainly pop and love songs. 
In 1999, after Lanre Faneyi's death, and the addition of Zeal Onyecheme, the name of the group was changed to Styl-Plus. In 2002 Yemi Akinwonmi left the group to pursue another career.

All The members of the group attended the Federal University of Technology in Akure.

Styl-Plus has been dubbed Africa's "Boys II Men" due to their ability to deliver heartfelt emotional ballads. The successful group of talented artists with their vocal harmonies, catchy tunes, melodies, R&B style, combined with meaningful and storytelling lyrics are a union between English and their native tongue Yoruba, spoken in Nigeria.

Styl-plus's first two albums include tracks like "Olufunmi", "Imagine That" (Produced by Tunde Akinsanmi), "Run Away", "Call My Name", "Stay Alive" and "Four Years". Other releases include "Unbreakable", "Ready to Go", "On the Dance Floor" featuring Jesse Jagz, "Ka Fo Lo (Let's Fly Away)", "Jekeserelo" featuring Chics Bad Boy Slim (produced by Tunde Akinsanmi) and "Baby Mo".

Releases
In late October 2003, under the old management (Joey & T-Jazz), they released two singles to radio stations.

In February 2006, they released their highly anticipated 11 track debut album "Expressions". The spectacular, star-studded album launch in Abuja and Lagos was rumored to have cost over N10 million (about $75,000) making it the most expensive album launch in Nigerian history.

In August 2012, the group released "Alive" featuring rapper, Sunky.

Their singles "Olufunmi" and "Runaway" were amongst the most requested love songs on all the major Nigerian R&B radio stations between 2004 and 2005. "Imagine That" is the lead single from their official debut album, Expressions. It has also been a massive chart topper, and has been used in numerous shows, including the pioneer edition of Big Brother Nigeria.

Other songs like "Four Years" and " Iya Basira" were campus hits at the time of their release. Most graduating students still play "Four Years" at their send off party at various universities all over Nigeria.

In December 2016, Shifi and Zeal  was signed up by Eskimo Records and shortly released a new single "Aso Ibora" (meaning blanket) a day before Valentine in 2017.

Awards

The group has received numerous Nigerian National awards as well as International awards by Channel O, Amen Awards and Kora Award nominees.   In 2005, Call My Name won best R&B video award by Channel O South African music station.

Discography

Albums
Expressions (2006)
Back and Better (2008)
Unbreakable

Selected singles
"Olufunmi"
"Olufunmi" (Remix) (featuring T Da Kapo)
"Runaway"
"Call My Name"
"Imagine That"
"Hadiza"
"Iya Basira"
"Ima"
"Always On My Mind"
"Stay Alive"
"Drives Me Crazy"
"Drives Me Crazy" (Remix) (featuring 2 Shotz)
"Four Years"
"When You Smile"
"Aso Ibora"

References

External links 

Nigerian contemporary R&B musical groups
Nigerian boy bands
English-language singers from Nigeria
Yoruba-language singers
Federal University of Technology Akure alumni
1997 establishments in Nigeria